Dronamraju may refer to:

 Dronamraju Krishna Rao (1937–2020), Indian geneticist
 Dronamraju Satyanarayana (1933–2006), Indian politician